Charles Richmond John Glover (1870–1936) was the Mayor of Adelaide from 1917 to 1919. He was in office when the City of Adelaide became a Lord Mayoralty in 1919, and so became Adelaide's first Lord Mayor. He served two further terms as Lord Mayor: from 1923 to 1925 and from 1930 to 1933.

He was a company director, active in the Freemasons and philanthropist. He established the three Glover playgrounds in the Adelaide Parklands that are named after him.

He was a major collector of books on Australia and the Pacific. This library was inherited by his son and, in turn, by his grandson. The collection, consisting of 2,787 lots, was sold by auction in December 1970.

He was a regular worshipper at St. John's Anglican Church and the author of History of the Church of St. John the Evangelist (1919).

He was father of Charles John Glover, known as Sir John Glover, Lord Mayor of Adelaide 1960-1963.

References

Valmai A. Hankel, 'Glover, Charles Richmond John (1870 - 1936)', Australian Dictionary of Biography, Volume 9, Melbourne University Press, 1983, pp 29–30.

Mayors and Lord Mayors of Adelaide
People educated at Prince Alfred College
1870 births
1936 deaths
Australian book and manuscript collectors